Mount Downton is the highest summit of the  diameter Itcha Range, located  northeast of Anahim Lake and  east of Far Mountain in the Chilcotin District of the Central Interior of British Columbia, Canada. It lies within Itcha Ilgachuz Provincial Park.


Name origin
Mount Downton was named for Geoffrey M. Downton, British Columbia Land Surveyor, for whom Downton Lake, the reservoir behind Lajoie Dam in the Bridge River Power Project is also named.  Downton is credited with first noting the hydroelectric potential inherent in the elevation differential between the Bridge River and Seton Lake on opposing sides of Mission Pass during a visit to the Bridge River Mining District in 1912.

Geology
Mount Downton is part of the Anahim Volcanic Belt, a west–east trending line of volcanoes formed when the North American Plate moved over a hotspot, similar to the one feeding the Hawaiian Islands, called the Anahim hotspot. The Anahim Volcanic Belt includes other immediately nearby ranges, the Rainbow and Ilgachuz Ranges.

See also
Ilgachuz Range
Rainbow Range
Anahim Volcanic Belt
Anahim hotspot
List of volcanoes in Canada
Volcanism of Western Canada

References 

Two-thousanders of British Columbia
Volcanoes of British Columbia
Landforms of the Chilcotin
Pleistocene volcanoes
Itcha Range
Range 3 Coast Land District